Bur cucumber is a common name for several plants and may refer to:

Cucumis anguria, native to Africa and naturalized in many other parts of the world
Echinocystis lobata, native to North America
Sicyos
Sicyos angulatus, native to eastern North America